Two ships of the United States Navy have been named Altamaha, after the Altamaha River of Georgia.

 USS Altamaha (CVE-6) was transferred to the Royal Navy upon completion in 1942, becoming .
 , served in the Pacific War from 1942 to 1945.

Sources

United States Navy ship names